Gloria Adwoa Foriwa (born 11 May 1981) is a Ghanaian footballer who played as a forward for the Ghana women's national football team. She was part of the team at the 2003 FIFA Women's World Cup and 2007 FIFA Women's World Cup. On club level she played for Ghatel Ladies in Ghana.

References

External links
 

1981 births
Living people
Ghanaian women's footballers
Ghana women's international footballers
Place of birth missing (living people)
2003 FIFA Women's World Cup players
2007 FIFA Women's World Cup players
Women's association football forwards